Brian Anthony Bruney (born February 17, 1982) is an American former professional baseball pitcher. He played in Major League Baseball (MLB) for the Arizona Diamondbacks, New York Yankees, Washington Nationals, and Chicago White Sox. He won the 2009 World Series with the Yankees, beating the Philadelphia Phillies.

Professional career

Arizona Diamondbacks
Bruney was drafted by the Arizona Diamondbacks in the 12th round (369th overall) after graduating from Warrenton High School (Oregon) in 2000. Bruney pitched in the minors from 2000 to 2003, Bruney was called up to the Diamondbacks on May 8, 2004, and made his major league debut that day against the Philadelphia Phillies, tossing a scoreless ninth inning in Arizona's 8–7 loss.

Bruney in his rookie year with the Diamondbacks posted a 4.31 ERA and struck out 34 batters in 31.1 innings. In 2005, the Diamondbacks tried Bruney as their closer, and he saved 12 games in 16 opportunities. Overall, the 2005 season turned out to be a poor showing for Bruney. In 47 relief appearances, he  posted a 7.43 ERA in 46 innings. In May 2006, Bruney was designated for assignment by the Diamondbacks.

New York Yankees

Bruney was later signed as a minor league free agent by the New York Yankees. Bruney pitched for the Triple-A Columbus Clippers until being recalled by the Yankees. Armed with an upper-90s fastball, mid-80s curveball and an aggressive approach, Bruney quickly established himself as one of the better relief pitchers in the Yankees' bullpen. Bruney finished  with a 1–1 record and a 0.87 ERA in 19 games (20.2 innings).

In , he spent time on both the Yankees' major league roster and their Triple-A team.  He ended the season with a 4.68 ERA in 58 major league games.

Bruney reported to spring training 2008 having lost 20 pounds in the offseason, in addition to gaining speed on his fastball. On April 25, 2008, it was learned that Bruney would likely miss the remainder of the season due to a fracture in his foot (Lisfranc) but he chose to forgo foot surgery in order to rehab the injury. After spending time rehabbing in the minors, he returned to the Yankees on August 1 following the trade of Kyle Farnsworth. On January 30, 2009, Bruney signed a one-year deal worth $1.25 million to avoid arbitration with the Yankees. He was slated to be Mariano Rivera's primary setup man going into the 2009 season.

In , Bruney spent part of the season on the disabled list with a 3.92 ERA and 1.51 WHIP in 39 innings pitched. On June 13, 2009, Bruney criticized New York Mets closer Francisco Rodríguez, calling his antics on the mound "unbelievable" and saying that Rodriguez has "got a tired act." Rodríguez responded after the Mets won that day's game by saying "somebody like that, it doesn't bother me," and suggesting that Bruney "better keep his mouth shut and do his job, not worry about somebody else. I don't even know who the guy is. I'm not going to waste my time with that guy. Instead of sending messages through the paper, next time when you see me at Citi Field, come up to me and say it to my face." During batting practice the following day at Yankee Stadium, Rodríguez confronted Bruney on the field, pointing and shouting at him before teammates from both sides could separate the two.

Bruney did not appear in the ALDS against the Twins or the ALCS against the Angels, but was added to the World Series roster. On October 28, it was announced that Bruney would be replacing backup catcher Francisco Cervelli on the 25-man roster for the World Series.

Washington Nationals

On December 7, 2009, Bruney was traded to the Washington Nationals for Jamie Hoffmann, Washington's pick in the 2009 Rule 5 draft.  On May 25, 2010, the Nationals released him after designating him for assignment on May 17.

Milwaukee Brewers and New York Mets
Bruney signed a minor league contract with the Milwaukee Brewers on June 1, 2010, but was released on June 21 after pitching  scoreless innings with the Triple-A Nashville Sounds. Bruney signed a minor league contract with the New York Mets on July 2, 2010. Bruney became a free agent after the 2010 season ended.

Chicago White Sox
In December 2010, Bruney signed a minor league contract with the Chicago White Sox. He had his contract purchased on May 30, 2011.  He made his debut with the White Sox on May 31 against the Boston Red Sox, allowing two runs in 2/3 of an inning. On August 5, the White Sox designated Bruney for assignment. He was released on August 15.

On November 29, 2011, Bruney re-signed a minor league contract with the White Sox. He was called up from AAA Charlotte on June 22, 2012, after Philip Humber was placed on the DL.

Personal life
As a child, Bruney was an extra in the movie Kindergarten Cop.

References

External links

Article in The Oregonian about Bruney

1982 births
Living people
People from Astoria, Oregon
Major League Baseball pitchers
Baseball players from Oregon
Arizona League Diamondbacks players
Yakima Bears players
South Bend Silver Hawks players
El Paso Diablos players
Tucson Sidewinders players
Gulf Coast Yankees players
Columbus Clippers players
Trenton Thunder players
Scranton/Wilkes-Barre Yankees players
Nashville Sounds players
Buffalo Bisons (minor league) players
Charlotte Knights players
Arizona Diamondbacks players
New York Yankees players
Washington Nationals players
Chicago White Sox players
People from Warrenton, Oregon